Cast Iron Hike was an American punk rock band from Clinton, Massachusetts, United States.

History
Cast Iron Hike was formed after the breakup of Worcester hardcore band Backbone, and featured that group's drummer (Dave Green) and guitarist (Chris Pupecki). They began by playing shows on the East Coast before releasing material in the mid and late 1990s in rapid succession, including EPs on Big Wheel Recreation and Trustkill Records, as well as a full-length on Victory Records. The group split up in the winter of 1997. Since then, guitarist Michael Gallagher went on to join Isis and to start MGR; Chris Pupecki currently plays guitar in both Doomriders and Blacktail; Dave Green is a university professor and the author of When Children Kill Children: Penal Populism and Political Culture (Oxford University Press); singer Jake Brennan has continued as a solo artist and as a member/producer of Bodega Girls; Pete deGraaf has played bass in a number of bands,  such as Villain and CLEARTHEWAY, and works as a sound engineer.

Members
David Green - drums
Christian Pupecki - guitar
Jake Brennan - vocals
Michael Gallagher - guitar
Peter deGraaf - bass

Discography

Full Length
Watch it Burn (Victory Records, 1997)

Extended plays
The Salmon Drive EP (Big Wheel Recreation, 1995)
Cast Iron Hike EP (Trustkill Records, 1996)

Splits
Shoot, Knife, Strangle, Beat and Crucify (GG Allin cover) split 7-inch with Miltown (Hatin' Life Records, 1997)

References

Hardcore punk groups from Massachusetts
Punk rock groups from Massachusetts
Musical groups from Worcester, Massachusetts
Victory Records artists
Trustkill Records artists